The Mercer 44 is an American  sailboat that was designed by William H. Tripp Jr as a bluewater cruiser and first built in 1959.

Production
The design was designed for and initially built by Mercer Reinforced Plastics of Trenton, New Jersey, United States, who completed six boats between 1960 and 1962. Cape Cod Shipbuilding then acquired the design and built eight boats between 1965 and 1982. Production has ended but Cape Cod Shipbuilding notes that the molds are still available and that they will build more if a fleet order is received.

Design
The Mercer 44 is a recreational keelboat, built predominantly of fiberglass, with wood trim. It has a masthead sloop rig or optional yawl rig. The hull has a spooned raked stem, a raised counter, plumb transom; a keel-mounted rudder controlled by a wheel and a fixed, modified long keel with a cutaway forefoot and a retractable centerboard. It displaces  and carries  of ballast.

The boat is fitted with a diesel inboard engine.

The design has sleeping accommodation for seven people, with a double "V"-berth in the bow cabin, two straight settees in the main cabin that unfold into doubles and an aft cabin under the raised doghouse, with a single berth on the starboard side. The galley is located on the port side just forward of the companionway ladder under the raised doghouse. The galley is "U"-shaped and is equipped with a four-burner stove, an ice box and a sink. An optional navigation station can be fitted in place of the seventh bunk, on the starboard side aft. The head is located just aft of the bow cabin on the port side and includes a shower.

For sailing downwind the design may be equipped with a symmetrical spinnaker.

Operational history
The boat is supported by an active class club, Mercer 44 Sailboats.

See also
List of sailing boat types

References

External links
Official website

Keelboats
1950s sailboat type designs
Sailing yachts 
Sailboat type designs by William H. Tripp Jr.
Sailboat types built by Cape Cod Shipbuilding
Sailboat types built by Mercer Reinforced Plastics